Wren Williams is an American businessman and politician serving as delegate for the 9th district of the Virginia House of Delegates. Williams, a Republican, defeated 7-term incumbent Charles Poindexter in the Republican primary, and Democratic nominee, activist Bridgette Craighead, in the 2021 Virginia House of Delegates election.  In 2022, Williams proposed a bill (House Bill number 781) that included a requirement that Virginia public schools must teach certain aspects of American history in an effort to eliminate Critical Race Theory being taught in schools. Wren Williams attended Hampden–Sydney College and Samford University's Cumberland School of Law.

On September 22, 2022, Williams was accused by fellow Republican state delegate Marie March of assault after a party fundraising event. March alleges that Williams intentionally shoved her, while Williams claimed that he accidentally bumped into her. Williams was formally charged with assault, but was found "not guilty," and alleges that March's accusations were a "political hit job" motivated by redistricting in which both delegates were merged into the same House district for the 2023 election.

Electoral History

References

Living people
Republican Party members of the Virginia House of Delegates
1989 births
Hampden–Sydney College alumni
Cumberland School of Law alumni
People from Patrick County, Virginia
21st-century American politicians